Achaura is a village in Ujhani Tehsil and Budaun district, Uttar Pradesh, India. It is 2 km away from Ujhani railway station. The village is administrated by Gram Panchayat. Its village code is 128518.

Connectivity
Ujhani railway station
Public Bus Stand
Private Bus Stand

References

Villages in Budaun district